The C&C 34 is a Canadian sailboat, that was designed by Robert W. Ball and first built in 1977.

The design was replaced in the C&C line in 1989 by a new Robert Ball design, the C&C 34/36.

Production
The boat was built by C&C Yachts in Canada, but it is now out of production.

Design

The C&C 34 is a small recreational keelboat, built predominantly of fiberglass, with wood trim. It has a masthead sloop rig, an internally-mounted spade-type rudder and a fixed fin keel or centreboard. It displaces  and carries  of lead ballast.

There was also an optional stub keel and centreboard version.

The boat is fitted with a Universal Atomic 4  gasoline engine.

The design has a PHRF racing average handicap of 105 with a high of 117 and low of 93.

See also
List of sailing boat types

Similar sailboats
Beneteau 331
Beneteau First Class 10
Catalina 34
Coast 34
Columbia 34
Columbia 34 Mark II
Creekmore 34
Crown 34
CS 34
Express 34
Hunter 34
San Juan 34
Sea Sprite 34
Sun Odyssey 349
Tartan 34 C
Tartan 34-2
Viking 34

References

Keelboats
1970s sailboat type designs
Sailing yachts
Sailboat type designs by Robert W. Ball
Sailboat types built by C&C Yachts